Antiga Vegueria Francesa  is a historical house located at Avinguda Meritxell, 13 in Andorra la Vella, Andorra. It is a heritage property registered in the Cultural Heritage of Andorra. It was built in 1941.

References

Buildings and structures in Andorra la Vella
Houses in Andorra
Houses completed in 1941
Cultural Heritage of Andorra